Angel Gelmi Bertocchi (24 April 1938 – 17 June 2016) was an Italian-born Bolivian Roman Catholic bishop.

Ordained to the priesthood in 1968, Gelmi Bertocchi served as the auxiliary bishop of the Roman Catholic Archdiocese of Cochabamba, Bolivia, from 1985 to 2013.

See also

Notes

1938 births
2016 deaths
21st-century Roman Catholic bishops in Bolivia
Italian emigrants to Bolivia
20th-century Roman Catholic bishops in Bolivia
Roman Catholic bishops of Cochabamba